Chance at Heaven is a 1933 American pre-Code drama film directed by William A. Seiter and written by Julien Josephson and Sarah Y. Mason based on a 1932 short story of the same name by Vina Delmar. The film stars Ginger Rogers, Joel McCrea, Marian Nixon, Andy Devine and Lucien Littlefield. It was released on October 27, 1933 by RKO Pictures.

Plot
Blacky owns a very successful service station in Silver Beach, Massachusetts, a summer resort for the wealthy. He plans to own a chain of stations someday and to marry his girlfriend Marje. However, he falls in love with Glory, a flirtatious, accident-prone debutante whose snobbish mother has just purchased a large summer home. An unlikely friendship develops between Glory and Marje, who sees that Blacky is truly in love with Glory and tells him to follow his heart and marry Glory.

Glory and Blacky elope and settle into his bungalow. Glory's mother weepily tells her that she has ruined her life. However, the newlyweds are happy and Glory soon learns that she is pregnant. Glory's mother tells her that she is only a child herself and that she has no idea what she will have to endure. Blacky is ecstatic, but Glory's mother later persuades him to permit Glory to visit New York for medical care even though the local doctor is a highly qualified obstetrician. The visit lasts several months. When Blacky learns from Marje that Glory's mother wants her trunks sent to California, he rushes to the city.

Blacky arrives at the New York apartment to find that Glory has changed dramatically and desires a divorce. She rejects Blacky's attempts at romance and tells him that the marriage was a mistake because he married the wrong kind of a girl. She wants a life with her friends and her mother. When Blacky asks about the baby, Glory's mother informs him that Glory had not actually been pregnant.

After the divorce, Blacky returns to his bungalow to find his old armchair in place and Marje preparing his favorite dinner.

Cast

References

External links
 
 
 
 

1933 films
1933 romantic drama films
American black-and-white films
American romantic drama films
1930s English-language films
Films based on short fiction
Films directed by William A. Seiter
Films scored by Max Steiner
Films scored by Roy Webb
RKO Pictures films
Films based on works by Viña Delmar
1930s American films